2017 Universiade may refer to:

2017 Summer Universiade, a summer sporting event held in Taipei
2017 Winter Universiade, a winter sporting event held in Almaty